Stephanie Sarai Salinas (born 18 March 1994) is a Mexican compound archer and part of the national team.

She participated in the team event and individual event at the 2013 World Archery Junior Championships, 2015 World Archery Championships in Copenhagen.

References 

1994 births
Mexican female archers
Living people
21st-century Mexican women